Nymphula corculina is a moth in the family Crambidae. It was described by Arthur Gardiner Butler in 1879. It is found in Japan (Hokkaido, Honshu) and the Russian Far East (Sakhalin, the Kuriles).

The length of the forewings is 7.4 mm for males and 8.2 mm for females. The forewings are dark brown. The base of the hindwings is pure white. Adults are on wing from late June to August.

The larvae feed on Potamogeton species. Young larvae mine the leaves of their host plant. Older larvae make a portable case of leaf fragments and feed externally. Full-grown larvae reach a length of 13–18 mm. The body and head and pale brown. Pupation takes place in the larval case.

References

Acentropinae
Moths described in 1879
Aquatic insects